Brandon Howard , also known as B. Howard, is an American singer, record producer and songwriter. His album Genesis was released in 2010. Howard was credited as songwriter and producer on the song "I Ain't Gotta Tell You" from Ne-Yo's album In My Own Words, which topped the Billboard 200 chart in 2006. Howard was also credited as a songwriter on "Can't Get Tired of Me" from the album Face Off, a collaborative album by Omarion and Bow Wow, which debuted at number 11 on the Billboard 200 in 2007. In 2016, Howard's single, Don't Say You Love Me, hit number 11 on Billboard's Top Dance charts.

Early life
B. Howard was born Brandon Howard in Los Angeles. He was raised between Los Angeles and Chicago. Howard's mother, Miki Howard is also a successful singer-songwriter. Joe Jackson, the patriarch of the Jackson family, was Miki's manager in the '80s. His grandmother was Josephine Howard of The Caravans, the first group to have a gospel song played on secular radio. B. Howard said he first considered working in finance. He was inspired by MTV videos of A-ha and Tears for Fears, instead choosing a career in music. He adopted the artist name "Sonik" and first worked with Gerald Levert in Cleveland, Ohio.

Music career
Howard has been working as a record producer since 2003.

B. Howard started a solo career in 2010 following the success of his single, "Dancefloor." In 2010, B Howard collaborated with Wyclef Jean and Jazmine Sullivan to revamp the song "Ke Nako" as a tribute to Nelson Mandela.

The first single from Genesis, "Super Model", was released via iTunes on February 8, 2011. The second single, "Dancefloor" made its US premiere on Wednesday, June 8 (2011) on iTunes and across all digital platforms. Howard performed in Japan to support this release. Howard is currently working on his upcoming American EP, Official. His single "I Do It" and released in 2013.

Howard's single, Don't Say You Love Me, hit number 11 on Billboard's Top Dance charts in January 2016. In 2018, Howard joined China's virtual star festival in Beijing.

Michael Jackson comparisons
Howard's similarities to the late pop icon Michael Jackson have been a source of speculation, and in 2014 FilmOn.com claimed to have evidence that proved paternity. The tests were subsequently proven to be inconclusive.

In March 2014, singer Akon gave an interview with Larry King in which he, as a recording artist who has worked with both Howard and Jackson, claimed to believe Howard was Michael Jackson's son.

In an interview published in 2021, Aaron Carter also gave an interview with Vlad TV in which he states that B Howard is Michael Jackson's son.

Discography

Production and songwriting

Artist

Genesis (released 2010)
 Super Model
 Addict
 Electric Lights featuring Kamilah
 Finally
 Once Again
 Take it Slow
 Flashback
 She's Got a Man
 Spend The Night
 Crush
 Ananda
 Killah
 Just Not Giving Up

Guest vocalist

Singles

Film

References

External links
 Official site

20th-century African-American male singers
African-American songwriters
Record producers from California
Musicians from Los Angeles
1981 births
Living people
Singer-songwriters from California
21st-century American singers
21st-century African-American musicians
American male singer-songwriters